Jane Cunningham (September 4, 1946) is an American politician from the state of Missouri. A Republican, Cunningham served as a member of the Missouri Senate, representing the 7th District from 2008 to early 2013. Due to Senate redistricting following the 2010 U.S. Census, Cunningham chose not to run for reelection in 2012.
Prior to serving in the Missouri Senate, Cunningham was a four-term member of the Missouri House of Representatives from 2000 through 2008. In January 2013 Cunningham made an unsuccessful bid to be Chairperson of the Missouri Republican Party. She failed to receive enough votes on the first ballot to advance to the second, which saw the election of Ed Martin to the position.

Legislation 
 In 2011 senator Cunningham sponsored bill SB 222 which sought to change Missouri's child labor laws to allow businesses to employ children under the age of fourteen and eliminate restrictions on the number of hours those children may work during the day [1].
 Early in 2011, she was the sponsor of the Amy Hestir Student Protection Act, which regulated how educators interact with students online, especially in social media networks (St. Louis Review Article)

References

External links
  MO SB22 – "Modifies the child labor laws"
 Missouri Senate – Jane Cunningham official government website
 Project Vote Smart – Jane Cunningham
 
 Follow the Money – Jane Cunningham
 2008 Missouri Senate campaign contributions
 2006 2004 2002 2000 Missouri House campaign contributions

1946 births
Living people
20th-century American politicians
21st-century American politicians
20th-century American women politicians
21st-century American women politicians
American Presbyterians
Republican Party Missouri state senators
Republican Party members of the Missouri House of Representatives
Politicians from Columbia, South Carolina
University of Missouri alumni
Women state legislators in Missouri